Gornja Crnuća is a village located in Gornji Milanovac municipality of Serbia. In the 2002 census, it had 239 residents. There are several points of significance in the village. It is best known for the house of Miloš Obrenović in which the Second Serbian Uprising was started, in fact, the village was the Capital of what was then Principality of Serbia for two years, from 1815 until 1818. The house was the official residence of the Sovereign, the Vraćevšnica Monastery which is one of the more significant Serbian monasteries. There also is a well-stocked hunting range and a wonderful scenic hiking path. The village was deemed an Ecological Village within the Ecological Municipality of Gornji Milanovac.

Notable people
 Mija Aleksić, actor

References

Populated places in Moravica District